Caryophyllidae is a botanical name at the rank of subclass.  At the moment there is no complete consensus about what orders it includes, except that it presumably contains the order Caryophyllales.  Note that this is only a naming difficulty: what to call various taxa of plants; there is little debate about how the plants in question are related.

A well-known system that used this name is the Cronquist system, and in the original, 1981, version of this system the circumscription was:

 subclass Caryophyllidae
 order Caryophyllales
 order Polygonales
 order Plumbaginales

These plants form the order Caryophyllales in the APG II system, 2003.

References

Historically recognized angiosperm taxa